Robert Alyngton (a.k.a. Arlyngton; died September 1398), was an English philosopher who developed new logical, semantic, metaphysical, and ontological theories in 14th century thought.  Alyngton is credited with creating the ideological foundation for the Oxford Realists by substituting reference to objective reality with reference to mental and linguistic reality.

Career
Alyngton was a Fellow of The Queen's College, Oxford from 1379 until 1386. He was deeply influenced by the metaphysics of John Wyclif who began his theological studies at Queen's College in 1363.  Alyngton was Chancellor of Oxford University in 1394–5. He later became Rector of Long Whatton, Leicestershire, until his death 1398.

Philosophical works
 Litteralis sententia super Praedicamenta Aristotelis — a commentary on Aristotle's Categories. This is Alyngton's most famous work.
 Tractatus de suppositionibus terminorum — a treatise on the supposition of terms.  Early linguistic philosophy.
 A commentary on the Liber sex principiorum.
 Tractatus generum — a treatise on the genera of being.

References

Year of birth unknown
1398 deaths
English philosophers
English logicians
Fellows of The Queen's College, Oxford
Chancellors of the University of Oxford
14th-century English Roman Catholic priests
14th-century philosophers
Philosophical realism
Place of birth unknown
People from Long Whatton